Jean Michel Tobie, born 6 October 1948, was the last mayor of the city of Ancenis (2001-2018) and the first mayor of the new commune of Ancenis-Saint-Géréon (2019-2020), in Loire-Atlantique, Pays de la Loire, France.

He used to be the president of communauté de communes du pays d'Ancenis from 2014 to 2020.

References

Living people
French politicians
Year of birth missing (living people)
Place of birth missing (living people)